Brno municipal election in 2014 was held as part of 2014 Czech municipal elections. It was held on 10 and 11 October 2014. 55 Members of Assemby were elected. Election was a victory for ANO 2011. A protest party called Žít Brno was also successful. Žít Brno is inspired by Icelandic Best Party.

ANO formed a coalition with Žít Brno, the Green Party and Christian and Democratic Union – Czechoslovak People's Party. Petr Vokřál became Mayor of Brno.

Results

References

2014
2014 elections in the Czech Republic